Peninsular Commons is a local political group based in Kowloon City founded in April 2020 by a group of young activists. It currently holds two seats in the Kowloon City District Council, Lee Hin-long who is also a Synergy Kowloon member and Tony Kwok Tin-lap of the Democratic Party.

History
In the pro-democracy primaries for the 2020 Legislative Council election, Peninsular Commons convenor Frankie Fung Tat-chun and Kowloon City District Councillor Lee Hin-long ran in a ticket in Kowloon West. The ticket came fourth and secured the nomination for the general election.

Representatives

District Councils

References

External links
Peninsular Commons's facebook page

Political organisations based in Hong Kong
Political parties established in 2020
2020 establishments in Hong Kong
Liberal parties in Hong Kong
Localist parties in Hong Kong